Dimethylthiambutene (N,N-Dimethyl-1-methyl-3,3-di-2-thienylallylamine, DMTB, trade names Ohton, Aminobutene, Dimethibutin, Kobaton, Takaton, Dimethibutin) is an opioid analgesic drug, most often used in veterinary medicine in Japan and to a lesser extent in other countries in the region and around the world.  It is the most prominent and widely used of the thiambutenes, a series of open-chain opioids structurally related to methadone which are also called the thienyl derivative opioids which also includes diethylthiambutene and ethylmethylthiambutene, as well as the non-opioid cough suppressant tipepidine.

Dimethylthiambutene was developed in the United Kingdom in the late 1940s and introduced to the market by Burroughs-Wellcome in 1951.  Dimethylthiambutene is now under international control under the UN Single Convention on Narcotic Drugs 1961, the laws governing habit-forming substances in virtually all countries and Schedule I of the US Controlled Substances Act of 1970 due to high abuse potential and never being introduced clinically in the United States; other countries regulate it much as morphine or diamorphine.  Its DEA ACSCN is 9619 and it had a zero manufacturing quota in 2013.

Synthesis

The conjugate addition between Ethyl crotonate [623-70-1][10544-63-5] (1) and dimethylamine gives Ethyl 3-(Dimethylamino)Butanoate [85118-28-1] (2). Grignard reaction with 2-Bromothiophene [1003-09-4] (3) gives (4). Dehydration in acid completed the synthesis (5).

See also
Diethylthiambutene
Tipepidine

References

Synthetic opioids
Thiophenes
Dimethylamino compounds
Mu-opioid receptor agonists